Imma asaphoneura is a moth in the family Immidae. It was described by Edward Meyrick in 1921. It is found on Fiji.

References

Moths described in 1921
Immidae
Moths of Fiji